Compost Everything: The Good Guide to Extreme Composting is a 2015 gardening book about extreme composting written by David the Good.

References

External links

Goodreads

American non-fiction books
2015 non-fiction books
English-language books
Gardening books
Composting